Alexandre Boumans (22 April 1893 – 6 November 1952) was a Belgian wrestler. He competed in the Greco-Roman featherweight event at the 1920 Summer Olympics.

References

External links
 

1893 births
1952 deaths
Olympic wrestlers of Belgium
Wrestlers at the 1920 Summer Olympics
Belgian male sport wrestlers
Place of birth missing